Sallowsprings is a  nature reserve in Whipsnade in Bedfordshire. It is managed by the Wildlife Trust for Bedfordshire, Cambridgeshire and Northamptonshire.

This site was formerly a caravan park, and it is now a traditional hay meadow. A rich variety of flowers includes common knapweed, bluebells and cowslips. An ancient hedgerow has a variety of shrubs such as holly.

There is access from the road called Sallowsprings.

References

Nature reserves in Bedfordshire
Wildlife Trust for Bedfordshire, Cambridgeshire and Northamptonshire reserves